Zgharta District is a district (qadaa) of the North Governorate, northern Lebanon. Its capital is the city of Zgharta.

Geography
The administrative center is the city of Zgharta. The district has 101 populated areas with 30 municipalities covering 37 villages. Some areas share the same municipality such as Ehden/Zgharta, Kfarsghab/Morh Kfarsghab, and Miziara/Harf Miziara. And there is one Municipalities Union.

The highest populated part of the district overlooks the Qozhaya Valley, which is the northern branch of the Holy Valley of Qadisha, a UNESCO World Heritage Site. The Horsh Ehden Nature Reserve is in the mountains within the district. This higher part of the district is a visitor destination, including the Monastery of Mar Sarkis and the Monastery of Qozhaya areas.

Economy
Agriculture stays the main activity of the district with an important olive oil production in the coastal area and fruits (apple and pears) in the mountain area. The recent years saw the development of a modest service sector around the economic pole of Zgharta.

Population
The officially registered persons in the district are estimated to 90,000 (est. 1998). Around 50% of the district population lives in the economic pole of Zgharta: Zgharta, Rachiine, Kfardlakos, Kfarhata, Mijdlayiah, Ardeh, Harf Ardeh. The majority of the population is Maronite Catholics, with a minority of Greek Orthodox, Armenians, Sunnite Muslims and others.

Towns and villages

References

 
Districts of Lebanon
North Governorate